The Horror Zine is an American fantasy and horror fiction pulp magazine first published in July 2009. The magazine was set up in Sacramento by Jeani Rector, a novelist and short-story writer with a taste for the macabre. She has been the editor for the magazine's entire run, and is assisted by Dean H. Wild. The Horror Zine has published established, professional writers, including Graham Masterton, Joe R. Lansdale, Piers Anthony, Ramsey Campbell, Elizabeth Massie, Simon Clark, Tom Piccirilli, Melanie Tem, and Bentley Little.

Staff
Jeani Rector, Editor (2009–present)
Dean H. Wild, Assistant Editor (2010–present)
Trish Wilson, Media Director (2021–present)
Bruce Memblatt, Kindle Coordinator (2012–present)
Heather Miller, Book Reviewer (2022–present)
John M. Cozzoli, Book Reviewer (2022–present)

Anthologies
Several anthologies of stories from The Horror Zine have been published.
And Now the Nightmare Begins (2009)
Twice the Terror (2010)
What Fears Become (2011)
A Feast of Frights (2012)
Shadow Masters (2013)
Shrieks and Shivers From The Horror Zine (2015)
The Best of The Horror Zine: The Early Years (2016)
The Horror Zine's Book of Ghost Stories (2020)
The Horror Zine's Book of Werewolf Stories (2022)
The Best of The Horror Zine: The Middle Years (2022)

Awards and recognition
Nominated 2009 British Fantasy Society Long List for Best Magazine
Nominated 2010 British Fantasy Society Long List for Best Magazine
Winner 2010 Preditors and Editors Best Fiction Magazine
Winner 2010 Preditors and Editors Best Poetry Magazine
Winner 2011 Preditors and Editors Best Poetry Magazine
Nominated 2012 British Fantasy Society Short List for Best Magazine
Nominated 2013 British Fantasy Society Long List for Best Magazine
First Place "Magazine of the Year" 2013 - This Is Horror
First Place Best Fiction Magazine - Preditors and Editors Critters Workshop (Yearly from 2010 - 2021)
First Place Best Poetry Magazine - Preditors and Editors Critters Workshop (Yearly from 2010 - 2021)

See also
 Fantasy fiction magazine
 Horror fiction magazine

Notes

External links

The Horror Zine official website
The Horror Zine About page
The Horror Zine Facebook page

Literary magazines published in the United States
Monthly magazines published in the United States
Fantasy fiction magazines
Horror fiction magazines
Magazines established in 2009
Magazines published in California
Mass media in Sacramento, California
Pulp magazines